Peter Hume may refer to:

 Peter Hume (politician) (born 1963), city councillor in the city of Ottawa, Ontario, Canada
 Peter Hume (musician) (born 1985), member of New Zealand rock band, Evermore

See also
 Peter Hume Brown (1849–1918), Scottish historian and professor